The Eminent Jay Jay Johnson may refer to:

 The Eminent Jay Jay Johnson Volume 1, a 1955 album by JJ Johnson
 The Eminent Jay Jay Johnson Volume 2, a 1954 album by JJ Johnson
 The Eminent Jay Jay Johnson Volume 3, a 1955 album by JJ Johnson